Coenonympha nolckeni is a species of butterfly in the family Nymphalidae. It is found in parts of the Tian-Shan region, mainly Uzbekistan, and north and west Pamir Mountains.  It is found in shrubby habitats and meadows at 2,000-3,300 m.

Flight period
The species is univoltine, being on wing between the end of May and July, depending on altitude and locality.

Food plants
Larvae feed on grasses.

Sources
Species info
BioLib.cz
"Coenonympha Hübner, [1819]" at Markku Savela's Lepidoptera and Some Other Life Forms
Guide to the Butterflies of Russia and Adjacent Territories Volume 1. Pensoft, Sofia - Moscow. 1997

Coenonympha
Butterflies described in 1874
Butterflies of Asia